St. Mary Armenian Church may refer to:

 Armenian Church, Brăila, Romania
 St. Mary Armenian Church, Saidabad, India
 St. Mary Armenian Apostolic Church, Toronto, Canada
St. Mary Church of New Julfa, Isfahan, Iran